Maurizio Bellin (born 2 April 1982 in Somma Lombardo) is an Italian former road cyclist.

Major results
2005
 2nd Giro della Valsesia
2007
 7th Ronde van Drenthe

References

External links

1982 births
Living people
Italian male cyclists
People from Somma Lombardo
Cyclists from the Province of Varese